Hishofuji Hiroki (born July 14, 1989 as Hiroki Sumi) is a former sumo wrestler from  Hyōgo-ku, Kobe, Japan. The highest rank he reached was Juryo 13, which he held for just a single basho. He wrestled for Nakamura stable until it closed down in December 2012, then transferring and finishing his career at Azumazeki stable. He retired in January 2017. He now lives in Los Angeles and participates in sumo exhibitions and amateur tournaments under the name Hiroki, often alongside Ulambayaryn Byambajav and  Yamamotoyama.

Career
Hiroki was always a large boy and by the time he had graduated from  Hyogo junior high school he was already 190 cm tall and weighted 120 kg. Hiroki was also a notable judoka at the prefectural level. This along with his exceeding size garnered him an invitation to join Nakamura stable. He made his debut in March 2005 and made steady progress up the banzuke. This continued until he reached Sandanme in March 2007 recording a mere three losing records on his way there. After a few losing records and bouncing between sandanme and Jonidan he returned to steady progress and was promoted to Makushita. This is where he would spend most of his career. He was helped along by the 2011 match fixing scandal which saw many wrestlers forced to retire, and in September 2011 was promoted to his career high rank of Juryo 13 and become a sekitori. Sadly he would win only four of his fifteen matches and was immediately demoted back down to makushita, he would never make it back to the salaried ranks again. In November 2012 with his stable master Fujizakura reaching the mandatory retirement age and closing down the stable he transferred to Azumazeki stable. In late 2013 Hiroki suffered a major right knee injury which would see him sit out for over a year and drop off the banzuke. He would return to the dohyo in January 2015 and start an impressive 22 win streak picking up two lower division yusho  (Jonokuchi and Sandanme) in the process. After this though he would put up mediocre records having been troubled by a left ankle issue. After three consecutive losing records and losing his opening bout of the January 2017 basho he decided to retire.

After retirement     

On 25 January 2017, it was announced by the Japan Sumo Association that Hishofuji was retiring from the sumo wrestling association. After his retirement from the Japan Sumo Association, he decided to leave Japan for the United States. Here he would start doing sumo exhibitions and amateur tournaments, often alongside Ulambayaryn Byambajav and  Yamamotoyama.
He also debuted in the WWE at the WWE Greatest Royal Rumble where he was the 7th entrant but, was quickly eliminated by Mark Henry. In July 2020 he appeared on Game On! with Bobby Lee.

Career record

See also
Glossary of sumo terms
List of past sumo wrestlers

References

External links

1989 births
Living people
Japanese sumo wrestlers